Lauren Howe (born July 7, 1993) is a Canadian television personality, Miss Universe Canada 2017, producer, actress and model. She competed at the Miss Universe 2017 pageant and placed in the top 10 at The AXIS, Las Vegas, Nevada on November 26, 2017.

Lauren is currently a correspondent for Citytv in Toronto, Ontario, predominantly for CityLine and Breakfast Television. She co-hosted the Canadian Broadcast Coverage of the 61st Annual Grammy Awards with Tracy Moore and Devo Brown.

Early life
Howe was born in Toronto, Ontario. Lauren is of French, German and Ukrainian background. She is an only child, raised by a single mother. Howe has a degree in Industrial Engineering from the University of Toronto was recognized as a "Top Ten Female Students to Watch".

Career

Pageantry
Howe joined Miss Teen Canada in 2011 for scholarship opportunities where she then won and placed in the Top 5 at Miss Teen World and began using it as a platform to support women pursuing educations and career in Science, technology, engineering, and mathematics. She later ran for Miss Universe Canada in 2014, where she finished as the 2nd runner-up to Chanel Beckenlehner.

Howe was crowned Miss Universe Canada 2017 on October 7, 2017 by Siera Bearchell and placed in the Top 10 at the Miss Universe 2017 pageant in Las Vegas in November.

Hosting and television
While in university, she worked as the In-Arena Host for the Toronto Maple Leafs. from 2014 to 2016. Howe has hosted other live events including the IIHF World U20 Championship, 2015 Pan American Games, Invictus Games and Rogers Cup.

In 2016, she became a correspondent for Citytv, co-hosting the Canadian National Broadcast of the 61st Annual Grammy Awards. She regularly appears on Breakfast Television, CityLine and has guest hosted Breakfast Television.

Acting and modeling 

She is a model with Sutherland Models and an actress with Butler Ruston Bell.

References

External links

1993 births
Living people
Canadian beauty pageant winners
Canadian beauty pageant contestants
Miss Universe 2017 contestants
People from Toronto
University of Toronto alumni